Diveyevo is a rural locality (a selo) and the administrative center of Diveyevsky District of Nizhny Novgorod Oblast, Russia. Population: 

Serafimo-Diveyevsky Convent, one of the largest and frequently visited monasteries in Russia, is located in Diveyevo. This is a popular Russian Orthodox pilgrimage destination because of major historical significance connected with Seraphim of Sarov.

References

Rural localities in Nizhny Novgorod Oblast
Diveyevsky District
Ardatovsky Uyezd (Nizhny Novgorod Governorate)